The Big Brawl, also known as Battle Creek Brawl, is a 1980 martial arts action comedy film, which marked Jackie Chan's first attempt to break into the American movie Hollywood market. A joint American and Hong Kong action film production, it was directed by Robert Clouse and featured much of the crew from Enter the Dragon (1973).

The film is set primarily in Chicago, Illinois in the 1930s (although it was shot in Texas) and follows Chan's character, a Chinese American martial artist, as he single-handedly takes on the Mafia. The film featured an appearance from Lenny Montana, who had famously played Luca Brasi in The Godfather.

While a moderate success in North America and Hong Kong, The Big Brawl was a box office disappointment as it performed below expectations in these markets, though it went on to have more success in other Asian and European markets. The film's disappointing performance in North America, however, led to Chan being advised to try supporting roles such as the Chinese racing car driver in The Cannonball Run. Chan later made another attempt to break into the American market with 1985's The Protector, which performed worse than this film. It was not until 1995 with Rumble in the Bronx that a Chan film showcasing his signature humor and stunt-work was a major hit in American theaters.

Plot
Set in Chicago in the 1930s, Jerry Kwan (Jackie Chan) leads a very easy-going life with his girlfriend, Nancy (Kristine DeBell), and his family. His father owns a restaurant, and one day, he is threatened by the mob to pay a part of his profits. As the mob exits, Jerry enters the scene and rushes out the door to catch up with them. He answers back by taking them on and eventually catches the eye of the mob for his unique and talented fighting abilities. In effect, he is forced to join the Battle Creek Brawl fight in Texas. The mob promises to return his brother's fiancée and give him the prize money as long as Jerry wins the tournament. He gets help from his uncle, a kung-fu teacher, to train him for the Battle Creek Brawl. They focus on Jerry's speed and agility as he must fight very tough opponents, one of them including Billy Kiss (H.B. Haggerty), the big, bulky, unbeatable winner from previous battles who kisses his opponents after they are defeated.

Cast

Production
In an interview with Chan on the region 2 DVD, Chan discusses the differences between Chinese and American styles of action. In his early US films, The Big Brawl and The Protector (1985), Chan had to perform the typical American fight sequences involving punches, kicks and doing few takes, all the way to the end of the action scene. It was not until Rumble in the Bronx (1995) that Chan was allowed to use more of his preferred action style, in which he works together with his stunt team and co-stars. It was also then that he was able to do as many takes as he needed in order to capture the sequences adequately.

In his autobiography I Am Jackie Chan: My Life in Action, Chan relates one scene in the production in which Robert Clouse was not interested in Chan's idea, which was to flip out of a car. Clouse wanted Chan to simply walk from the car to his father's restaurant. Chan responded, "No one will pay money to see Jackie Chan walk!", and felt that the lack of freedom to choreograph sequences the way he wanted underlined the reason for the film's failure.

The climactic fight scene was filmed in Floresville, Texas and featured 1,200 extras.

Reception
On Rotten Tomatoes the film has an approval rating of 67% based on reviews from six critics.  Variety magazine gave it a generally favorable review at the time, calling it "an amusing chopsocky actioner whose appeal is not limited to the usual audience for this genre."

Box office
The Big Brawl opened on August 29, 1980, on 231 screens in the United States and Canada. In its opening weekend, it grossed US$1,108,025 ($4,792 per screen). By October 1980 (upon its release in England), the film had grossed  in the United States, making it a commercial success there. It sold  US tickets and ranked among the year's top 40 highest-grossing films in North America, with its US gross equivalent to  adjusted for inflation in 2018. However, it was ultimately a disappointment to distributor Warner Brothers, who were expecting an Enter the Dragon sized hit.

In Hong Kong, the film grossed HK$5,776,530. This made it the year's second top-grossing film at the Hong Kong box office, and was higher than Enter the Dragon which had grossed  in Hong Kong. However, the film's performance in Hong Kong was considered a disappointment to Golden Harvest.

The film had more success in other international markets. In Taiwan, it grossed  (US$212,587) from 296,931 admissions, becoming the second top-grossing film of 1980. In South Korea, it was also the second top-grossing film of 1980 (behind Jackie Chan's The Young Master), with 233,674 admissions in Seoul, equivalent to an estimated . In Japan, it grossed .

In France, where the film released as Le Chinois on February 18, 1981, it was the 24th-highest-grossing film of 1981 with 1,510,009 admissions, equivalent to an estimated  (US$4,688,376). In Germany, where it released on March 1, 1981, it was the 43rd-highest-grossing film of 1981 with 174,967 box office admissions, equivalent to an estimated  (US$479,574). In Spain, the film sold 486,489 tickets, equivalent to an estimated .

In terms of box office admissions, the film sold a combined  tickets in the United States, Taiwan, Seoul, France, Germany and Spain.

See also
 Jackie Chan filmography
 List of martial arts films

References

External links
 
 
 

1980 films
1980 martial arts films
1980s martial arts comedy films
American action comedy films
American martial arts comedy films
English-language Hong Kong films
Films scored by Lalo Schifrin
Films set in Chicago
Films set in San Antonio
Golden Harvest films
Hong Kong action comedy films
Hong Kong martial arts comedy films
Karate films
Kung fu films
Martial arts tournament films
Warner Bros. films
1980s English-language films
1980s American films
1980s Hong Kong films